"Do It" is a song by Canadian singer Nelly Furtado from her third studio album, Loose (2006). It was written by Furtado, Tim "Timbaland" Mosley and Nate Hills. It was produced by Timbaland and Nate "Danja" Hills. The song features a prominent influence of 1980s dance music and sexually suggestive lyrics, in which the song's protagonist asks a lover to satisfy her sexually.

"Do It" reached the top twenty in Canada and was a number-one dance hit in the United States, where it became Furtado's lowest peaking single on the Billboard Hot 100.

The music video for "Do It" was directed by Aaron A. (the documentarian on Furtado's Get Loose Tour), and co-directed by Furtado. It was shot on location in Detroit. The video was premiered on MuchMusic on July 13, 2007, and on MTV's Total Request Live on August 1, 2007.

In January 2007, it was revealed that Timbaland plagiarized the synth line in "Do It" from an earlier track by Finnish demoscener Janne Suni and Glenn Rune Gallefoss.

Composition
Furtado has credited the influence of 1980s musicians such as Blondie, Madonna, the Police, Prince and Talking Heads on Loose, saying that the album's creative team "were picking up on some of the more surreal, theatrical elements of '80s music, the stuff that puts you in sort of a dream state. There's a mysterious, after-midnight vibe to this album that's extremely visceral. I want people to escape into the music and indulge their most animalistic impulses." Referring to the sexually suggestive lyrics in "Do It" and other songs on Loose, Furtado cited the influence of what she described as "the assertive female sexuality of '90s hip-hop, from Queen Latifah to MC Lyte, Yo-Yo, Salt-N-Pepa, TLC. They were sexy, smart and creative—strong women in control. That's what I like about the sexual content on Loose: It's very organic."

The melody, chord progression and other elements were taken from the track "Acidjazzed Evening" by Janne Suni.

Critical reception
Billboard magazine said "[it] again demonstrates Furtado's striking versatility [...] Missy Elliott is stripped onto the single version, with a midsection breakdown . . . amusing, but hardly necessary in scoring yet another essential moment from [Loose]". Stylus magazine cited the track and "No Hay Igual" as the album's "undisputed highlights [...] The two songs couldn't possibly be more different, yet the duo [Furtado and Timbaland] manages to convincingly pull off both of them." Slant Magazine said the song is "a deliciously uptempo 80's cut", and The Guardian wrote that Furtado "delivers irresistible hooks of Maneater, Promiscuous and Do It with punchy, playful charisma rather than breathy cooing." Blogcritics published a more negative assessment of the song:

The Village Voice wrote that the song "weakly evokes J.J. Fad" and exemplified why Loose "isn't a love child [between Furtado and Timbaland], but a bump-and-grind that never finds a groove". The Northern Light editorialised, "Although "Do It" fits well after "Say It Right" [the preceding track on the album], there is something very D+ about the song. As cute as it is, it sounds like something that was just better than a filler track." MTV News summarised "Do It" as a "roller-skating jam [that] is all percolating, bubblegum keyboards", and said it contained "one of Timbaland's best beats since he put the snakey whistle on Ludacris' "The Potion"". Kelefa Sanneh of The New York Times wrote of the album and song, "Ms. Furtado and Timbaland love unexpected details, and this secretly meticulous CD is full of them [...] in "Do It", Ms. Furtado mutters a casual "Yeah"; Timbaland samples it and turns it into a rhythm instrument that returns at the end of the song, to reward everyone who's paying attention." Billboard magazine wrote that the song contains "breezy uptempo rhythmic instrumentation alongside a sensual lyric that requests a suitor to deliver the physical goods", and that it is one of the tracks on Loose on which "she extorts Gwen Stefani's '80s vibe and schoolgirl chants". Hope, Clover. Other critics have identified a 1980s influence in the song. Stylus magazine described "Do It" as an "undeniable '80s dance-pop" song on which "she [Furtado] conjures the ghost of Vanity, weaving her wickedly mischievous falsetto through Timbaland's synth splashes." According to The Northern Light, Furtado "sings on a bouncy '80s-style track—complete with the keyboard solo—about something reminiscent of a night of high school romance. The track echoes Gwen Stefani's "Crash", but with less of a dance groove." The Observer said that the song "drops an early Eighties Street Sounds electro-pop motif into some frisky footwork from Timbaland", and Slant Magazine characterised the song as an "'80s uptempo cut that imagines what The Jets would've sounded like if they'd been singing about getting some instead of just having crushes". The website Okayplayer called "Do It" and the Loose tracks "Maneater" and "Glow" "electronic-influenced dance songs" similar to another track, "Promiscuous", with "a club-friendly '80s-influenced synthesizer melody." Sun Media described it as "'80s-era Madonna-reminiscent", and a writer for the blog MTV Buzzworthy said it sounds like "a mash-up of old-school Madonna".

Music video
The music video for "Do It" was co-directed by Furtado and Aaron A, the documentarian on Furtado's Get Loose Tour. The filming took place on location in Detroit, one of the stops on the tour. It begins in a women's restroom, in which dancers on Furtado's tour are getting ready to go out. Furtado emerges and starts singing, and she and the dancers leave the restroom and walk out of the club while Furtado is holding a gnome. During daytime, Furtado's dancers walk down the street to her apartment, walk into her bedroom and wake her up. They get dressed and ready to dance, run down the stairs and tow a car into the studio, where Furtado begins performing choreography with her dancers. The video is intercut with shots of Furtado and her dancers wearing white clothing while singing in feathers.

The video was premiered on MuchMusic on July 13, 2007, and on MTV's Total Request Live on August 1, 2007. It debuted on the TRL top ten countdown on August 9, returned to it on August 27 and reached number one on six days. The video spent seventeen days on the countdown. It also reached number one on VH1's VSpot Top 20 Countdown, Furtado's most successful video on that countdown

Controversy

In January 2007, several news sources reported that Timbaland was alleged to have plagiarized several elements (both motifs and samples) in the song "Do It" without giving credit or compensation. The song itself was released as the fifth North American single from Loose on July 24, 2007.

The original track, titled "Acidjazzed Evening", is a chiptune-style 4-channel Amiga module composed by Finnish demoscener Janne Suni.

Chart performance
The song debuted on the US Billboard Hot 100 at number eighty-eight but dropped off the next week. It peaked at number sixty on the Billboard Pop 100. "Do It" was Furtado's second consecutive single not to reach the top twenty on the Hot 100 or Pop 100 charts, and the lowest peaking single from Loose on both charts; it is also Furtado's lowest charting entry on the Hot 100. It became the fifth consecutive number-one single from Loose on the Billboard Hot Dance Club Play chart. On the Canadian Hot 100, the song debuted at number sixty in early August 2007 and peaked at number eleven.

In Europe, "Do It" reached number twenty-two in Germany, remaining on the singles chart for nine weeks. The single reached the top twenty in the Netherlands and Norway and the top forty in Switzerland and Belgium. It charted outside the top forty in Austria. In the United Kingdom, "Do It" debuted at number ninety-five and peaked on its fourth week of charting at number seventy-five and dropped off the next week.

Track listings

Digital download
"Do It" featuring Missy Elliott – 3:27

CD single
"Do It" (Radio Mix) – 3:29
"Do It" featuring Missy Elliott – 3:26

CD maxi single
"Do It" (Radio Mix) – 3:29
"Do It" featuring Missy Elliott – 3:26
"All Good Things (Come to an End)" (Kaskade Remix) – 6:44
"Do It" (Video) – 3:33

Personnel
Credits adapted from the Loose liner notes.
Nelly Furtado – lyrics, background vocals
Timbaland – producer, drums, keyboards
Danja – producer, keyboards
Demacio "Demo" Castellón – additional programming, mixing, recording, engineering
Marcella "Ms. Lago" Araica – additional recording
James Roach – second engineer
Kobla Tetey – second engineer
Ben Jost – second engineer
Vadim Chislov – second engineer
Jim Beanz – vocal production
Recorded and mixed at The Hit Factory Criteria, Miami, Florida

Charts

Weekly charts

Year-end charts

Release history

See also
List of Billboard Hot Dance Club Play number ones of 2007

References

2006 songs
2007 singles
Nelly Furtado songs
Dance-pop songs
Songs involved in plagiarism controversies
Music videos directed by Aaron A
Song recordings produced by Jim Beanz
Song recordings produced by Danja (record producer)
Song recordings produced by Timbaland
Songs written by Nelly Furtado
Songs written by Timbaland
Geffen Records singles
Mosley Music Group singles